Tribbles homolog 3 is a protein that in humans is encoded by the TRIB3 gene.

Function 

The protein encoded by this gene is a putative protein kinase that is induced by the transcription factor NF-kappaB. It is a pseudoenzyme that is thought to be a negative regulator of NF-kappaB, and can also sensitize cells to TNF- and TRAIL-induced apoptosis. In addition, this protein has been reported to negatively regulate the cell survival serine-threonine kinase AKT1. TRIB3 has recently been associated with neuronal signalling, and like TRIB1 and TRIB2, could be considered as a potential allosteric drug target

Interactions
TRIB3 has been shown to interact with:
 AKT1,
 CSNK2B, 
 Fibronectin 
 MCM3AP,
 RELA,
 SIAH1, and
 TIAF1.

References

Further reading

EC 2.7.11